Daniel Linton Watters (born March 18, 1971) is an American former competition swimmer who participated in the 1988 Summer Olympics in Seoul, South Korea.  Watters competed in the B Final of the men's 100-meter breaststroke, and finished with the fifteenth-best time overall.

See also
 List of University of Texas at Austin alumni

References

1971 births
Living people
American male breaststroke swimmers
Olympic swimmers of the United States
Swimmers at the 1988 Summer Olympics
Texas Longhorns men's swimmers
Place of birth missing (living people)